Heart of America (also released as Home Room) is a 2002 Canadian-German drama film written and directed by Uwe Boll about the events leading up to and revolving around a shooting on the final day of school. The film features an ensemble cast including Jürgen Prochnow, Michael Paré, Elisabeth Moss, Patrick Muldoon, Clint Howard, and Brendan Fletcher. The film also addresses the issue of school bullying.

Plot 
The last day of school contains many problems for both teachers and students of Riverside High School, and there are multiple storylines about this.

The principal, Harold Lewis, must discipline English teacher William Pratt, who has let his professional frustrations get the better of him, while guidance counselor Vanessa Jones attempts to get through to student drug dealer Wex Presley, who is ruining her students.

Meanwhile, Principal Lewis' daughter, Karen, is having trouble with her boyfriend, Tommy Bruno, outcast Dara McDermott craves drugs, a pregnant girl named Robin Walters argues with her boyfriend, Kevin Rhodes about her future options; and bully Ricky Herman begins to recognize the consequences of his actions.

Unbeknownst to these people, two bullied students and best friends Daniel Lynne and Barry Shultz are about to shoot up the school as an act of revenge against their tormentors. Barry, however, is having second thoughts, while the seething Daniel prepares to unleash his rage. Daniel decides to attack his high school on the last day, insisting that he does not care if he lives or dies, tired of constant harshness and abuse from his uncaring father, Artie and from bullies at school; Ricky among them. On the last day, Daniel carries out his plan, aided by Dara who spontaneously joins him. Daniel confronts three of his past tormentors: Paul, Ricky, and Jeff and kills them. Kevin is shot and killed when he and Robin come into the line of fire, much to Daniel's regret while Robin is spared. Meanwhile, Dara walks into her English class and kills Mr. Pratt, and Karen, who had been a rival for the attentions of Tommy. Dara is then subdued by bully Donny Pritzee and is turned over to the police. Barry walks away from the school, having bailed out on the plan, believing there are other responses to the abuse he and Daniel suffered in the past. A lone gunshot then rings out as Daniel commits suicide.

As the film ends, a reporter informs the public of the school shooting, revealing that Daniel committed suicide, and the camera turns away from the TV to show Barry's and Daniel's shocked parents watching. At Daniel's home, the phone begins to ring, but Artie cannot bring himself to pick it up. The film then ends as a voice lists off major incidents of violence perpetrated by minors.

Cast

References

External links
 

2002 films
2000s teen drama films
Canadian drama films
Canadian films about revenge
English-language Canadian films
2000s English-language films
Films directed by Uwe Boll
Films about school violence
Films about suicide
Works about the Columbine High School massacre
Canadian nonlinear narrative films
Teenage pregnancy in film
Films about bullying
Films set in the United States
2002 drama films
English-language German films
2000s Canadian films
2000s German films